Childwall Sports and Science Academy is a secondary school in Liverpool, England, with a sixth form. It is an academy and part of the Lydiate Learning Trust.

Academic performance and inspections

As of 2022, the college's most recent inspection by Ofsted was in May 2022, with a judgement of Good. Judgements from earlier years were:

 2014: Requires Improvement
 2016: Requires Improvement
 2018: Requires Improvement

In 2019 the school's Progress 8 score at GCSE was 0.61, "well below average". The Attainment 8 score was 38, compared to 41 in Liverpool as a whole. 17% of children that year were entered for the English Baccalaureate, compared to the Liverpool average of 31%. 24% of children that year achieved grade 5 or above in maths and English at GCSE, compared to 36% in Liverpool. At A-Level in 2019 the average grade was D+, compared to C in Liverpool as a whole.

History
The school was originally known as Holt High School for Boys. It was located on Queen's Drive. It had around 600 boys and a three-form entry in the mid 1940s.

It became the co-educational Holt Comprehensive School in September 1967, when Holt High School for Boys merged with Olive Mount School for Girls. It later was renamed to Childwall Comprehensive School, then Childwall Community School. After becoming a specialist Sports College, the school was renamed Childwall Sports College.

Notable former pupils

Childwall Valley High School for Girls

 Alma Cullen, screenwriter and playwright
 Alison Steadman OBE, actress
 Marion Studholme, soprano with the Sadler's Wells Opera Company, now English National Opera (ENO)
 Pauline Yates, actress

Holt High School for Boys

 Prof John Horton Conway FRS, mathematician and Professor Emeritus at Princeton University, known for Conway's Game of Life
 Sir Ken Dodd OBE, comedian
 John Shirley-Quirk CBE, bass-baritone
 Sir David Webster, Chief Executive from 1945-70 of the Royal Opera House

Holt Comprehensive School
 Rt Rev Nicholas Baines, Bishop of Croydon from 2003, subsequently Bishop of Bradford
 Tony Bellew, former professional boxer
 Neil Danns, footballer
 Mark Womack, actor

References

External links 
 Childwall Academy Website
 WikiMapia
 EduBase

Secondary schools in Liverpool
Academies in Liverpool